The Kilkenny Archaeological Society is an archaeological society in County Kilkenny, Ireland.

History
The Kilkenny Archaeological Society was founded in 1946. An older society with the same name existed, which developed into the Royal Society of Antiquaries of Ireland.

Rothe House in Kilkenny is owned by the Kilkenny Archaeological Society since 1962 and functions as their headquarters and local history museum.

Old Kilkenny Review

The Kilkenny Archaeological Society publishes the Old Kilkenny Review, a historical journal which reviews County Kilkenny's history.

References

Further reading 

 .
 .
.

External links 
 

1946 establishments in Ireland
Historical societies based in the Republic of Ireland
Learned societies of Ireland
History of County Kilkenny
Organizations established in 1946
Publications established in 1948
Archaeology journals
Annual journals
English-language journals
Kilkenny_(city)